Semenkovo is a rural locality (a village) in Pogorelovskoye Rural Settlement, Totemsky  District, Vologda Oblast, Russia. The population was 11 as of 2002.

Geography 
Semenkovo is located 57 km southwest of Totma (the district's administrative centre) by road. Boyarskoye is the nearest rural locality.

References 

Rural localities in Totemsky District